D. R. Settinayake was the 32nd Auditor General of Ceylon. He was appointed on 15 August 1969, succeeding B. L. W. Fernando, and held the office until 11 October 1971. He was succeeded by P. M. W. Wijayasuriya.

References

Auditors General of Sri Lanka